The Journal of Fish Diseases is a peer-reviewed monthly journal publishing original research on disease in both wild and cultured fish and shellfish. According to the Journal Citation Reports, the journal has a 2014 impact factor of 2.056.

References

English-language journals
Ichthyology journals
Veterinary medicine journals